Suffolk House may refer to:

Suffolk Place, or Suffolk House, a former mansion house located in Southwark, England
Northumberland House, or Suffolk House, a former townhouse in London, England
Suffolk House, Penang, an estate of two early residences in Penang, Malaysia

See also
Suffolk (disambiguation)